1047 Geisha, provisional designation , is a stony Florian asteroid from the inner regions of the asteroid belt, approximately 11 kilometers in diameter. It was discovered on 17 November 1924, by German astronomer Karl Reinmuth at the Heidelberg-Königstuhl State Observatory in southwest Germany. The asteroid was named after the British musical The Geisha.

Orbit and classification 

Geisha is a member of the Flora family, a giant asteroid family and the largest family of stony asteroids in the main-belt. It orbits the Sun in the inner main-belt at a distance of 1.8–2.7 AU once every 3 years and 4 months (1,225 days; semi-major axis 2.24 AU). Its orbit has an eccentricity of 0.19 and an inclination of 6° with respect to the ecliptic.

The body's observation arc begins with its official discovery observation in November 1924.

Physical characteristics 

In the Tholen classification, Geisha is stony S-type asteroid, which is also the overall spectral type for members of the Flora family.

Rotation period 

In February 2006, a rotational lightcurve of Geisha was obtained from photometric observations by Italian amateur astronomer Laurent Bernasconi. Lightcurve analysis gave a somewhat longer-than-average rotation period of 25.62 hours with a brightness amplitude of 0.33 magnitude.

Diameter and albedo 

According to the survey carried out by the NEOWISE mission of NASA's Wide-field Infrared Survey Explorer, Geisha measures between 9.96 and 10.729 kilometers in diameter and its surface has an albedo between 0.277 and 0.30.

The Collaborative Asteroid Lightcurve Link assumes an albedo of 0.24 – derived from 8 Flora, namesake and parent body of the Flora family – and calculates a diameter of 11.52 kilometers based on an absolute magnitude of 11.86.

Naming 

This minor planet was named after the British musical The Geisha, a story of a tea house (1896). 
The official naming citation was mentioned in The Names of the Minor Planets by Paul Herget in 1955.

References

External links 
 Asteroid Lightcurve Database (LCDB), query form (info )
 Dictionary of Minor Planet Names, Google books
 Asteroids and comets rotation curves, CdR – Observatoire de Genève, Raoul Behrend
 Discovery Circumstances: Numbered Minor Planets (1)-(5000) – Minor Planet Center
 
 

001047
Discoveries by Karl Wilhelm Reinmuth
Named minor planets
001047
19241117